The Mura Statistical Region is a statistical region in northeast Slovenia. It is predominantly agricultural with field crops representing over three-quarters of the total agricultural area (twice as much as the Slovene average). Climate and soil combined have made it the region with the highest crop production, but its geographical position and inferior infrastructure put it at a disadvantage and it is the region of Slovenia with the lowest GDP per capita (EUR 12,267) and the highest rate of registered unemployment.

Cities and towns 
The Mura Statistical Region includes four cities and towns, the largest of which is Murska Sobota.

Municipalities
The Mura Statistical Region comprises the following 27 municipalities:

 Apače
 Beltinci
 Cankova
 Črenšovci
 Dobrovnik
 Gornja Radgona
 Gornji Petrovci
 Grad
 Hodoš
 Kobilje
 Križevci
 Kuzma
 Lendava
 Ljutomer
 Moravske Toplice
 Murska Sobota
 Odranci
 Puconci
 Radenci
 Razkrižje
 Rogašovci
 Sveti Jurij ob Ščavnici
 Šalovci
 Tišina
 Turnišče
 Velika Polana
 Veržej

Demographics 
The population in 2020 was 114,238. It has a total area of 1,337 km2.

Economy 
Employment structure: 57.3% services, 39.9% industry, 2.7% agriculture.

Tourism 
It attracts 10.2% of the total number of tourists in Slovenia, most being from Slovenia (62.4%).

Transportation 
 Length of motorways: 64.5 km
 Length of other roads: 3,103.5 km

References

Statistical regions of Slovenia